The Highlands long-finned eel (Anguilla interioris, also known as the New Guinea eel) is an eel in the family Anguillidae. It was described by Gilbert Percy Whitley in 1938. It is a tropical eel known from freshwaters in eastern New Guinea. The eels spend most of their lives in freshwater but migrate to the ocean to breed. Males can reach a maximum total length of 80 centimetres.

Anguilla interioris is considered most similar morphologically to Anguilla celebensis and Anguilla megastoma.

References

Anguillidae
Fish described in 1938